Scythris piriensis is a moth of the family Scythrididae. It was described by Bengt Å. Bengtsson in 2014. It is found in South Africa (Eastern Cape).

References

Endemic moths of South Africa
piriensis
Moths described in 2014